EMI Classics was a record label founded by Thorn EMI in 1990 to reduce the need to create country-specific packaging and catalogues for internationally distributed classical music releases. After Thorn EMI demerged in 1996, its recorded music division became the EMI Group. Following the European Commission's approval of the takeover of EMI Group by Universal Music in September 2012, EMI Classics was listed for divestment. The label was sold to Warner Music Group, which absorbed EMI Classics into Warner Classics in 2013.

Classical recordings were formerly simultaneously released under combinations of Angel, Seraphim, Odeon, Columbia, His Master's Voice, and other labels, in part because competitors own these names in various countries.  These were moved under the EMI Classics umbrella to avoid the trademark problems. Prior to this, compact discs distributed globally bore the Angel Records recording angel logo that EMI owned globally. Releases created for distribution in specific countries continued to be distributed under the historical names, with the exception of Columbia, since EMI had sold the Columbia name to Sony Music Entertainment. The red logo harkens back to the Red Seal releases, introduced by EMI predecessor the Gramophone Company in 1902: HMV classical releases were issued with red labels. EMI Classics was also responsible for managing Pye Records' classical recordings acquired by Thorn EMI in 1990.

EMI Classics also included the Virgin Classics label, both of them were formerly managed under The Blue Note Label Group in the U.S. until 2013.

With the sale of EMI to Universal Music Group in 2012, European regulators forced Universal Music to divest itself of EMI Classics, which was operated with other European EMI assets to be divested as the Parlophone Label Group. In February 2013, Universal Music sold the Parlophone Label Group, including EMI Classics and Virgin Classics, to Warner Music Group. The European Union approved the deal on May, and WMG took control of the label on 1 July.  It was then announced that the EMI Classics artist roster and catalogue would be absorbed into the Warner Classics label and Virgin Classics would be absorbed into Erato Records.

Artists

Composers

 Thomas Adès
 Craig Armstrong
 Howard Goodall
 Karl Jenkins
 Jon Lord
 Sir Paul McCartney
 Wim Mertens
 Michael Nyman
 Zbigniew Preisner
 John Rutter
 John Tavener
 Michael Tippett
 Mohammed Abdel Wahab

Conductors

 Claudio Abbado
 Sir John Barbirolli
 Daniel Barenboim
 Sir Thomas Beecham
 Sir Adrian Boult
 William Christie
 Alan Curtis
 Lawrence Foster
 Wilhelm Furtwängler
 Carlo Maria Giulini
 Emmanuelle Haïm
 Bernard Haitink
 Vernon Handley
 Daniel Harding
 Richard Hickox
 Mariss Jansons
 Paavo Järvi
 Herbert von Karajan
 Rudolf Kempe

 Otto Klemperer
 John Lanchbery
 Sir Charles Mackerras

 Sir Neville Marriner
 Jean Martinon
 Kurt Masur
 Ingo Metzmacher
 Riccardo Muti
 Sir Roger Norrington
 Sir Antonio Pappano
 Michel Plasson
 André Previn
 Sir John Pritchard
 Sir Simon Rattle
 Jérémie Rhorer
 Wolfgang Sawallisch
 Jeffrey Tate
 Franz Welser-Möst
 Sir David Willcocks

Chamber ensembles

 Ahn Trio
 L'Arpeggiata
 Artemis Quartet
 Alban Berg Quartett

 Belcea Quartet
 Eroica Trio
 Quatuor Ébène
 Wiener Stringsextet

Libera

Choirs and vocal ensembles

 Cantorion
 Choir of Clare College Cambridge
 Choir of King's College, Cambridge
 Christ Church Cathedral Choir, Oxford
 John Alldis Choir
 Kindred Spirits

 The King's Singers
 Royal Liverpool Philharmonic Choir
 Rundfunkchor Berlin
 Westminster Abbey Choir
 Winchester Cathedral Choir

Libera

Orchestras

 Academy of St. Martin in the Fields
 Les Arts Florissants
 Berliner Philharmoniker
 Le Cercle de l'Harmonie
 Il Complesso Barocco
 Le Concert d'Astrée
 Deutsche Kammerphilharmonie Bremen
 English Chamber Orchestra

 Estonian National Symphony Orchestra
 Europa Galante
 Frankfurt Radio Symphony Orchestra
 London Chamber Orchestra
 London Philharmonic Orchestra
 London Symphony Orchestra
 Orchestre Philharmonique de Monte Carlo
 Philharmonia Orchestra
 Royal Philharmonic Orchestra

Instrumentalists

Piano

 Simon Trpčeski
 Leif Ove Andsnes
 Piotr Anderszewski
 Martha Argerich
 Daniel Barenboim
 Michel Béroff
 Jonathan Biss
 Youri Egorov
 Ingrid Fliter
 David Fray
 Evgeny Kissin

 Stephen Kovacevich
 Li Yundi
 Dong-Hyek Lim
 Gabriela Montero
 John Ogdon
 Awadagin Pratt
 André Previn
 Anne Queffélec
 Ayako Uehara
 Lars Vogt
 Alexis Weissenberg

Violin

 Renaud Capuçon
 Sarah Chang
 Kyung-wha Chung
 Vilde Frang
 Jascha Heifetz (recording for HMV in the 1930s)
 Nigel Kennedy
 Sir Yehudi Menuhin

 Anne-Sophie Mutter
 David Oistrakh
 Itzhak Perlman
 Nadja Salerno-Sonnenberg
 Christian Tetzlaff
 Maxim Vengerov
 Frank Peter Zimmermann

Cello

 Andreas Brantelid
 Gautier Capuçon
 Han-na Chang
 Natalie Clein
 Steven Isserlis
 Julian Lloyd Webber

 Jacqueline du Pré
 Truls Mørk
 Mstislav Rostropovich
 Trey Lee Chui-yee
 Robert Cohen

Trumpet
 Maurice André
 Ole Edvard Antonsen
 Alison Balsom
 Markus Stockhausen

Guitar
 Manuel Barrueco
 Xuefei Yang

Oboe
 Christoph Hartmann

Clarinet

 Sabine Meyer

Flute
 Emmanuel Pahud
 Ransom Wilson

Organ
 Naji Hakim

Sitar
 Purbayan Chatterjee
 Anoushka Shankar
 Ravi Shankar

Singers

Soprano

Elly Ameling
 Maria Callas
 Patrizia Ciofi
 Diana Damrau
 Natalie Dessay
 Véronique Gens
 Angela Gheorghiu
 Barbara Hendricks

 Ruth Ann Swenson
 Natasha Marsh
 Mady Mesplé
 Kate Royal
 Dame Elisabeth Schwarzkopf
 Dame Kiri Te Kanawa
 Liping Zhang

Mezzo-soprano
 Dame Janet Baker
 Joyce DiDonato
 Fairuz
 Christa Ludwig
 Réjane Magloire

Contralto
 Kathleen Ferrier
 Umm Kulthum

Countertenor
 Max Emanuel Cenčić
 David Daniels
 Philippe Jaroussky
 Gérard Lesne

Tenor

 Roberto Alagna
 Alfie Boe
 Ian Bostridge
 Franco Corelli
 George Dalaras

 Plácido Domingo
 Abdel Halim Hafez
 Simon O'Neill
 Rolando Villazón

Baritone
 Olaf Bär
 Thomas Hampson

Bass
 Jonathan Lemalu
 Willard White

Crossover acts

 Keedie Babb
 Sarah Brightman
 Celtic Tenors
 Celtic Woman
 Keith Emerson
 Giorgia Fumanti
 Lesley Garrett
 Jane Gilchrist
 John Wilson Orchestra

 Myleene Klass
 Libera
 Mediæval Bæbes
 Maksim Mrvica
 Nigel Kennedy Quintet
 The Planets
 Anoushka Shankar
 Wild

Catalogue series

 100 Best (6-CD budget series)
 20th Century Classics series (2-CD)
 American Classics
 Black Boxes (Virgin Classics 5-CD budget series)
 British Composers
 Debut (developing artist series)
 Encore (1-CD budget series)
 EMI Masters
 EMI - The Home of Opera
 Gemini (2-CD mid-price series)
 Great Artists of the Century
 Great Recordings of the Century
 Historical (series of public domain recordings)
 ICON series
 The Karajan Collection

 The Klemperer Legacy
 Legend (CD+DVD series)
 Maria Callas Edition
 Opera Series (budget opera series without libretto)
 The Perlman Edition
 The Platinum Collection (3-CD budget series from EMI UK)
 Recommends Series (Gramophone / Penguin Guide recommended series from EMI UK)
 Références (historical series from EMI France)
 Rouge et Noir (2-CD mid price series from EMI France)
 The Classics (Virgin Classics budget series)
 Triples (3-CD budget series)
 Veritas (Virgin Classics original instrument recordings)
 Virgin de Virgin
 Virgo (Virgin Classics budget series)

See also
Lists of record labels

References

1990 establishments in the United Kingdom
2013 disestablishments in the United Kingdom
Record labels established in 1990
Record labels disestablished in 2013
Warner Music labels
Labels distributed by Warner Music Group
Labels distributed by Universal Music Group
British record labels
EMI
Universal Music Group
Classical music record labels